Ave Maria is 1918 British silent drama film directed by Wilfred Noy and starring Concordia Merrel, Rita Jonson and Roy Travers.

Cast
 Concordia Merrel as Margaret  
 Rita Jonson as Helen Grey  
 Roy Travers as Jim Masters  
 H. Manning Haynes as Jack Haviland  
 A. B. Imeson as Guy Fernandez  
 Sydney Lewis Ransome as Providence 
 William Lugg as Sir John Haviland

References

Bibliography
 Robert B. Connelly. The Silents: Silent Feature Films, 1910-36, Volume 40, Issue 2. December Press, 1998.

External links

1918 films
1918 drama films
British drama films
Films directed by Wilfred Noy
British silent feature films
British black-and-white films
1910s English-language films
1910s British films
Silent drama films